Pradel Pompilus (1914–2000) was a Haitian writer. Pompilus "is considered one of the most respected Haitian scholars." He is best known for his three-volume study of Haitian literature.

Notes

References

 

1914 births
2000 deaths
Haitian non-fiction writers
Haitian male writers
Linguists of pidgins and creoles
20th-century non-fiction writers
Male non-fiction writers